Scott Hobson (born 25 January 1988) is a Rugby Union player for Bath in the Aviva Premiership.

References
 Bath sign up forwards Scott Hobson and Mark Lilley – BBC Sport. 18 March 2010. Retrieved 2010-06-01

External links
 Bath Player Profile

1988 births
Living people
English rugby union players
Bath Rugby players
Rugby union players from Truro